Subhan Fajri (born 13 May 2003) is an Indonesian professional footballer who plays as a winger for Liga 1 club Dewa United and the Indonesia national under-23 team.

Club career

Persiraja Banda Aceh
He was signed for Persiraja Banda Aceh to play in Liga 1 in the 2021 season. Fajri made his first-team debut on 11 September 2021 in a match against PSS Sleman at the Gelora Bung Karno Madya Stadium, Jakarta.

Dewa United
Subhan was signed for Dewa United to play in Liga 1 in the 2022–23 season. He made his league debut on 31 July 2022 in a match against Persikabo 1973 at the Indomilk Arena, Tangerang.

International career
In 2018, Fajri represented the Indonesia U-16, in the 2018 AFC U-16 Championship. On 30 May 2022, Fajri made his debut for an Indonesian youth team against a Venezuela U20 squad in the 2022 Maurice Revello Tournament in France.

Career statistics

Club

References

External links
 Subhan Fajri at Soccerway
 Subhan Fajri at Liga Indonesia

2003 births
Living people
Indonesian footballers
Liga 1 (Indonesia) players
Persiraja Banda Aceh players
Association football midfielders
Sportspeople from Aceh
People from Bireuën
Dewa United F.C. players
Indonesia youth international footballers